Biržai Regional Park covers  in northern Lithuania near its border with Latvia.  It was established in 1992 to preserve a distinctive karst landscape. About 20% of its area is covered by forest.

The park is notable for its sinkholes, created by the dissolution of the gypsum underlying its soil. About 9,000 sinkholes have been identified; the most notable is the Karves uola (Cow's Cave), which is about 20 meters deep. In 1998 the use of pesticides and fertilizers in the area was restricted.

See also
Biržai Forest

Footnotes

References
   Titulinis. Biržai district municipality.
 Directorate of Birzai regional park.  Association of Lithuanian State Parks and Reserves.
 Central and Eastern European Sustainable Agriculture. Food and Agriculture Organization of the United Nations.
 Sinkholes and subsidence. Tony Waltham, Frederic Gladstone Bell, M. G. Culshaw, Springer, 2005, .

Regional parks of Lithuania
Sinkholes of Europe
Tourist attractions in Panevėžys County